Petr Smíšek (born 22 January 1978) is a Czech footballer. His position is striker.

Smíšek spent his early career with Viktoria Plzeň, where he played 59 top-flight matches, scoring 7 goals. He finished the season as third top scorer with Plzeň in the 2002–03 Czech 2. Liga, scoring 13 goals, as the club won the division and promotion back to the Gambrinus liga. In 2003, he had a trial with 2. Fußball-Bundesliga side SV Wacker Burghausen. He ultimately signed for Jablonec, where he spent three and a half seasons, before moving on to Teplice in the summer of 2007.

He has a twin brother called Martin, who is also a footballer.

References

External links
 
 

1978 births
Living people
Czech footballers
Czech Republic youth international footballers
Czech First League players
FC Viktoria Plzeň players
FK Jablonec players
FK Teplice players
Expatriate footballers in Germany
FC Rot-Weiß Erfurt players
3. Liga players
Association football forwards
Sportspeople from Plzeň